Amas de casa desesperadas may refer to.

Amas de casa desesperadas (Argentine TV series), 2006
Amas de casa desesperadas (2007 TV series), a Colombian–Ecuadorian TV series
Amas de casa desesperadas (American TV series), 2008

See also
Desperate Housewives, an American comedy drama/mystery television series